The 2012 Copa Libertadores de América (officially the 2012 Copa Santander Libertadores for sponsorship reasons) was the 53rd edition of the Copa Libertadores de América, South America's premier international club football tournament organized by CONMEBOL. It ran from January 24 to July 4, 2012. Santos were the defending champions, but lost to Corinthians in the semifinals.

São Paulo-based club Corinthians won the competition, with an undefeated campaign, after defeating six-time champion Boca Juniors in the finals. It is Corinthians' first Libertadores title. By winning the competition, Corinthians won the right to play in the 2012 FIFA Club World Cup and the 2013 Recopa Sudamericana.

Qualified teams

Draw
The draw of the tournament was held on November 25, 2011, at 15:00 UTC−03:00, in Luque, Paraguay.

For the first stage, each of the six ties contains one team from each pot. For the second stage, each of the eight groups contains one team from each pot. Teams from the same association in Pots 1 and 3 cannot be placed in the same group. However, a first stage winner may be drawn with a team from the same association in the second stage.

As per agreement when deciding the seeding for the 2011 Copa Libertadores, Bolivia, Chile, Paraguay and Uruguay all had their berth 1 teams be seeded teams for 2012 instead of the berth 1 teams from Colombia, Ecuador, Peru and Venezuela for 2011.

† Teams had not yet fully qualified to the specific berth when the draw took place.

Schedule
All dates listed are Wednesdays, but matches may be played on the day before (Tuesdays) and after (Thursdays) as well.

First stage

The First Stage, played in home-and-away two-legged format, began on January 24 and ended on February 2. Team 1 played the second leg at home.

|}

Second stage

The second stage, played in home-and-away round-robin format, began on February 7 and ended on April 19. The top two teams from each group advanced to the round of 16.

Group 1

Group 2

Group 3

Group 4

Group 5

Group 6

Group 7

Group 8

Knockout stages

The last four stages of the tournament (round of 16, quarterfinals, semifinals, and finals), played in home-and-away two-legged format, form a single-elimination tournament, contested by the sixteen teams which advance from the Second Stage.

Seeding
The 16 qualified teams are seeded in the knockout stages according to their results in the second stage, with the group winners seeded 1–8, and the group runners-up seeded 9–16. The teams were ranked by: 1. Points (Pts); 2. Goal difference (GD); 3. Goals scored (GF); 4. Away goals (AG); 5. Drawing of lots.

Bracket

Round of 16
The Round of 16 began on April 25 and ended on May 10. Team 1 played the second leg at home.

|}

Quarter-finals
The Quarter-finals began on May 16 and ended on May 24. Team 1 played the second leg at home.

|}

Semi-finals
The Semifinals began on June 13 and ended on June 21. Team 1 played the second leg at home.

|}

Finals

The Finals were played over two legs, with the higher-seeded team playing the second leg at home. If the teams were tied on points and goal difference at the end of regulation in the second leg, the away goals rule would not be applied and 30 minutes of extra time would be played. If still tied after extra time, the title would be decided by penalty shootout.

Corinthians won on points 3–1.

Top goalscorers

Awards

Player of the week

Fair play award
The Samsung Fair Play Trophy was awarded to Brazilian club Corinthians.

Notes
Brazilian coach Ricardo Ferretti sent a team of substitutes of Tigres UANL, and was heavily criticized by the Latin press that claimed that he had "ignored" the competition.

See also
2012 FIFA Club World Cup
2012 Copa Sudamericana
2013 Recopa Sudamericana

References

External links

Official webpage  

 
2012
1